Greben' Island is a small island lying close north of the east end of Haswell Island in the Haswell Islands of Antarctica. It was photographed and plotted by the Soviet expedition of 1956, and named Greben' (comb) because of its ridgelike shape.

See also 
 List of antarctic and sub-antarctic islands

References

Islands of Queen Mary Land